Stankova is a village in the north of Kalush Raion, Ivano-Frankivsk Oblast, on the border of Stryi Raion, Lviv Oblast. It belongs to Verkhnia rural hromada, one of the hromadas of Ukraine.
The population of the village is 1,266 persons  and Local government is administered by Stankovaska village council. To the village council Stankova belongs Vylky village.

Geography 

History and Attractions 
The first written mention of the village belongs to 1158.

The village has two churches:
1. Of the Archangel Michael Church (built in 1994).
2. Church of the Nativity. The wooden church, an architectural monument of local importance (built in 1866).

References

External links 
 Історія села Станкова Калуського району - історичне прикарпаття 
 weather.in.ua/ Stan'kova (Ivano-Frankivsk region)

Villages in Kalush Raion